David Mendoza may refer to:
David Mendoza Arellano (born 1970), Mexican politician
David Mendoza (footballer) (born 1985), Paraguayan footballer